K.G.K. PG College is well-known college in Moradabad district. K.G.K. PG College formerly affiliated to Agra University and later with M. J. P. Rohilkhand University in 1973. The full name of K.G.K. PG College is Kedar Nath Girdharilal Khatri PG College (Hindi:केदार नाथ गिरधारीलाल खत्री स्नातकोत्तर महाविद्यालय).

K.G.K. College was established in 1944 as a primary school. The late educationalist Sahu Girdhari Lal ji and his son Sahu Sambhu Nath Khanna ji established it as a degree college in 1948. For the last 58 years, the college has served education needs in Moradabad and nearby cities.

Courses 
K.G.K. College provides courses in the Arts and Sciences streams. The courses are offered by the college in accordance with the syllabi and prescriptions of the M. J. P. Rohilkhand University.

Graduate programs 
 Arts: BA in Hindi, Sanskrit, English, Geography, History, Economics, Sociology, Political Science, Psychology, Philosophy, Mathematics, Defense Studies
 Science: B.Sc in Mathematics, Physics, Chemistry, Botany, Zoology, Economics, Geography, Defense Studies
 Law: LL.b

Undergraduate programs 
 Arts: Hindi, Sanskrit, English, Geography, Economics, History, Sociology, Philosophy, Political Science, Psychology, Mathematics
 Science: Mathematics, Physics, Chemistry

Research programs 
 Ph.D.: Hindi, Sanskrit, English, Geography, Economics, History, Sociology, Philosophy, Political Science, Psychology, Mathematics, Physics, Chemistry

Faculties 
 Department of Economics
 Department of English
 Department of Geography
 Department of History
 Department of Hindi                              
 Department of Political Science             
 Department of Psychology
 Department of Philosophy
 Department of Sociology
 Department of Sanskrit
 Department of Defense Studies
 Department of Physics
 Department of Chemistry
 Department of Mathematics
 Department of Law
 Department of Commerce

Notable alumni 
 Mohammad Rizwan, MLA
 Mohd Faeem, MLA

See also
 Moradabad
 Government Degree College Sambhal

References

External links 
 Official Website

Postgraduate colleges in Uttar Pradesh
Education in Moradabad
1948 establishments in India
Educational institutions established in 1948